Gerard Peter O'Brien (born 12 November 1942) is a former Irish first-class cricketer.

O'Brien was born at Dublin in County Down and was educated in the city at O'Connell School. A wicket-keeper for Malahide at club level, O'Brien played two first-class cricket matches for Ireland. The first came against Scotland at Glasgow in 1976, with his second match coming against the same opposition at Dublin in 1977. Across his two first-class matches, O'Brien scored a total of 22 runs, with a high score of 11. He worked in the insurance industry as his profession.

References

External links

1942 births
Living people
Cricketers from Dublin (city)
Irish cricketers